Sons-et-Ronchères is a commune in the Aisne department in Hauts-de-France in northern France.

Population

See also
Communes of the Aisne department

References

Communes of Aisne
Aisne communes articles needing translation from French Wikipedia